The Adullamites were a short-lived anti-reform faction within the UK Liberal Party in 1866.  The name is based on a biblical reference to the cave of Adullam where  David and his allies sought refuge from Saul. 

After the death of Palmerston in 1865, a second Reform Act became a priority for the Liberal Party. However, not all sections of the party agreed with this agenda. The most important internal opposition came from the Adullamites. The faction was led by Robert Lowe and Lord Elcho; the name was coined by John Bright, a biblical reference that would have been widely understood at the time. After repeated attacks on William Ewart Gladstone's bill, they finally defeated the government over an amendment to the Bill on 18 June 1866, which was carried by 315 to 304. This vote gave the Prime Minister, Russell, cause to resign. There was an abortive attempt to form a Conservative/Adullamite coalition. However, the Adullamites were not prepared to accept Disraeli as leader and negotiations broke down. This led to the formation of Derby's 3rd Conservative Minority Administration - who, ultimately, proposed their own reform bill. The Adullamites (with some exceptions) then returned to the Liberal party.

Prominent Adullamites
Augustus Anson
Sir George Bowyer, Bt.
Frederick Doulton
Lord Dunkellin
Lord Elcho
Edward Ellice
William Henry Gregory
The Earl Grey
Earl Grosvenor
Gilbert Heathcote
Edward Horsman
Samuel Laing
The Marquess of Lansdowne
The Earl of Lichfield
Robert Lowe
Sir Robert Peel, Bt.
Sir Richard William Bulkeley, Bt.

See also
 Liberal Unionist Party - split from the Liberals in 1886 over Irish Home Rule
 National Liberal Party (UK, 1931)
 Social Democratic Party (UK) - split from the Labour Party in 1981 and ultimately merged with the Liberals

References
Oxford Dictionary of National Biography, "Cave of Adullam"
 

Politics of the United Kingdom
Liberal Party (UK)
Political party factions in the United Kingdom